George Atwell Cooke (Cook) was an Ontario lawyer and political figure. He represented Oxford South in the Legislative Assembly of Ontario from 1884 to 1886 as a Liberal member.

He was born in Norwich Township, Oxford County, the son of doctor Ephraim Cook, who came to Upper Canada from Massachusetts in 1830. He was called to the bar in 1876. Cooke was elected to the provincial assembly in an 1884 by-election held after Adam Crooks retired from politics.

External links
The Canadian parliamentary companion, 1885 JA Gemmill

Ontario Liberal Party MPPs
Canadian people of American descent